Michima Lonco (fl. mid-16th century) (michima means "foreigner" and lonco means "head" or "chief" in Mapudungun language) was a Picunche chief said to be a great warrior, born in the Aconcagua Valley and educated in Cusco by the Inca Empire. He presented himself to the Spaniards, naked and covered by a black pigmentation.

On September 11, 1541, Michimalonco attacked the newly founded Spanish settlement of Santiago, Chile after seven caciques were taken hostage by Spaniards following an uprising. Michimalonco was said to lead 8,000 to 20,000 men. The defense of the outnumbered town was led by Inés de Suárez, a female conquistador, while commander Pedro de Valdivia was elsewhere. Much of the town was destroyed when Suárez decapitated one of the caciques herself and had the rest decapitated to surprise the natives. The natives were then driven off by the Spanish.

After fighting the Spaniards, he fled to the Andes mountain valleys. There he hid for a couple of years but feeling homesick he came back to the valley and allied his forces with the Spaniards and went to fight the Mapuches on the south. He was reputedly raised in Cuzco and acquired a Quechua accent when speaking his native language, therefore he was named the "Foreigner Chief".

References

Sources 
 Jerónimo de Vivar,  Crónica y relación copiosa y verdadera de los reinos de Chile (Chronicle and abundant and true relation of the kingdoms of Chile) ARTEHISTORIA REVISTA DIGITAL; Crónicas de América (on line in Spanish)

16th-century Mapuche people
16th-century indigenous people of the Americas
Year of birth unknown
Year of death unknown
Indigenous leaders of the Americas
Toquis
Warriors of Central and South America